The 2011–12 Saudi Crown Prince Cup was the 37th season of the Saudi Crown Prince Cup since its establishment in 1957. This season's competition featured a total of 16 teams, 14 teams from the Pro League, and 2 teams from the Qualifying Rounds.

Al-Hilal won their fifth Crown Prince Cup title in a row and eleventh in total after defeating Al-Ettifaq 2–1 in the final.

Qualifying rounds
All of the competing teams that are not members of the Pro League competed in the qualifying rounds to secure one of 2 available places in the Round of 16. First Division sides Al-Shoulla and Al-Tai qualified.

First round
The First Round matches were played on 19, 20, & 21 October 2011.

Second round
The Second Round matches were played on 31 October and 1 November 2011.

Third round
The Third Round matches were played on 20 November 2011.

Final round
The Final Round matches were played on 4 December 2011.

Bracket

Note:     H: Home team, A: Away team

Round of 16
The Round of 16 fixtures were played on 20 and 21 December 2011. All times are local, AST (UTC+3).

Quarter-finals
The quarter-finals fixtures were played on 23 and 24 January 2012. All times are local, AST (UTC+3).

Semi-finals
The semi-finals fixtures were played on 27 and 28 January 2012. All times are local, AST (UTC+3).

Final

The final was held on 10 February 2012 in the King Fahd International Stadium in Riyadh. All times are local, AST (UTC+3).

Winner

Top goalscorers
Updated 10 February 2012

References

Saudi Crown Prince Cup seasons
2011–12 domestic association football cups
Crown Prince Cup